Konstantinos (Kostas) Palios (1926 – December 26, 1996) was a Greek actor.  He played secondary roles in many movies.  His most popular appearance was in The kopani of Giorgos Konstantinou as a paper robber duke.  His final appearance of his career was in the serial Sofia orthi.  He played in 37 movies and 6 television series.

Partial filmography

In television

Sofia orthi (Σοφία ορθή)

References

External links

1924 births
1996 deaths
Greek male actors
20th-century Greek male actors
People from Amorgos